The Pittsburgh Penguins 2006–07 season was rife with potential, as the team featured one of the largest groups of young stars in the National Hockey League (NHL). Evgeni Malkin, the second overall pick in the 2004 NHL Entry Draft, came to the United States from Russia prior to the season and joined the team. He promptly became the first NHL rookie since 1917 to score goals in each of his first six games. Malkin and second-year phenom Sidney Crosby were joined by 18-year-old Jordan Staal, who made the jump directly from the Ontario Hockey League (OHL) to the Penguins roster after being drafted second overall in the 2006 NHL Entry Draft. The Penguins also brought back Mark Recchi via free agency, giving Recchi his third stint with the team. It would also be the first season the team would have involving defenceman and soon-to-be alternate captain Kris Letang.

The season was clouded with uncertainty, however, about the Penguins' future in Pittsburgh.  After Jim Balsillie had agreed to purchase the franchise for $175 million and to keep it in Pittsburgh, the situation seemed settled.  Balsillie's deal fell through, however, in December. Isle of Capri Casinos was next to make a bid to keep the team in Pittsburgh, but their deal was nixed as well.  On January 3, 2007, Penguins officials, including Mario Lemieux and other members of the team's ownership group, visited Kansas City, Missouri, to discuss potentials of relocating the team there.  Other cities which reportedly have expressed interest in the franchise include Houston, Winnipeg, Portland and Oklahoma City.

On March 14, 2007, in a joint announcement by Pennsylvania Governor Ed Rendell, Allegheny County Executive Dan Onorato, Pittsburgh Mayor Luke Ravenstahl and Mario Lemieux, it was made public that an agreement had been reached between the parties. A new state-of-the-art multi-purpose arena (the Consol Energy Center) will be built. This agreement will keep the Penguins in Pittsburgh for another 30 years. Following the announcement of this plan, the Lemieux ownership group announced that they no longer have plans to sell the team.

On January 9, 2007, the NHL announced that Sidney Crosby had been voted by the fans to start at forward in the 2007 All-Star Game in Dallas, Texas. Malkin, Staal and defenseman Ryan Whitney were all invited to All-Star Weekend to play in the YoungStars game.

The rebuilding of the team that came with acquiring Sidney Crosby would come to fruition in his second year. This season began a playoff streak for the Penguins that has lasted for 16 seasons and is currently the longest in all of the four North American professional sports.

Regular season
The Penguins finished the regular season having scored 94 power-play goals, the most in the NHL. They also had the most power-play opportunities, with 463.

Season standings

Schedule and results

|-  style="background:#cfc;"
| 1 || 5 || 7:30 PM || Philadelphia Flyers || 0–4 || Pittsburgh Penguins || Civic Arena (16,957) || 1–0–0 || 2
|-  style="background:#fcf;"
| 2 || 7 || 7:30 PM || Detroit Red Wings || 2–0 || Pittsburgh Penguins || Civic Arena (15,318) || 1–1–0 || 2
|-  style="background:#cfc;"
| 3 || 12 || 7:00 PM || Pittsburgh Penguins || 6–5 || New York Rangers || Madison Square Garden (IV) (18,200) || 2–1–0 || 4
|-  style="background:#fcf;"
| 4 || 14 || 7:30 PM || Carolina Hurricanes || 5–1 || Pittsburgh Penguins || Civic Arena (14,351) || 2–2–0 || 4
|-  style="background:#fcf;"
| 5 || 18 || 7:30 PM || New Jersey Devils || 2–1 || Pittsburgh Penguins || Civic Arena (17,030) || 2–3–0 || 4
|-  style="background:#cfc;"
| 6 || 19 || 7:30 PM || Pittsburgh Penguins || 4–3 OT || New York Islanders || Nassau Veterans Memorial Coliseum (10,258) || 3–3–0 || 6
|-  style="background:#cfc;"
| 7 || 21 || 7:30 PM || Columbus Blue Jackets || 3–5 || Pittsburgh Penguins || Civic Arena (14,637) || 4–3–0 || 8
|-  style="background:#cfc;"
| 8 || 24 || 7:00 PM || New Jersey Devils || 2–4 || Pittsburgh Penguins || Civic Arena (13,190) || 5–3–0 || 10
|-  style="background:#cfc;"
| 9 || 28 || 7:00 PM || Pittsburgh Penguins || 8–2 || Philadelphia Flyers || Wells Fargo Center (19,589) || 6–3–0 || 12
|-

|-  style="background:#cfc;"
| 10 || 1 || 10:30 PM || Pittsburgh Penguins || 4–3 OT || Los Angeles Kings || Staples Center (18,118) || 7–3–0 || 14
|-  style="background:#fcf;"
| 11 || 4 || 10:30 PM || Pittsburgh Penguins || 2–3 || San Jose Sharks || SAP Center at San Jose (17,496) || 7–4–0 || 14
|-  style="background:#ffc;"
| 12 || 6 || 10:00 PM || Pittsburgh Penguins || 2–3 OT || Anaheim Ducks || Honda Center (16,599) || 7–4–1 || 15
|-  style="background:#ffc;"
| 13 || 8 || 7:30 PM || Tampa Bay Lightning || 4–3 OT || Pittsburgh Penguins || Civic Arena (14,483) || 7–4–2 || 16
|-  style="background:#fcf;"
| 14 || 10 || 7:30 PM || Ottawa Senators || 6–3 || Pittsburgh Penguins || Civic Arena (17,052) || 7–5–2 || 16
|-  style="background:#fcf;"
| 15 || 11 || 7:00 PM || Pittsburgh Penguins || 2–6 || Carolina Hurricanes || PNC Arena (18,726) || 7–6–2 || 16
|-  style="background:#cfc;"
| 16 || 13 || 7:30 PM || Philadelphia Flyers || 2–3 || Pittsburgh Penguins || Civic Arena (13,781) || 8–6–2 || 18
|-  style="background:#fcf;"
| 17 || 17 || 8:00 PM || Pittsburgh Penguins || 2–4 || Buffalo Sabres || First Niagara Center (18,690) || 8–7–2 || 18
|-  style="background:#cfc;"
| 18 || 18 || 7:30 PM || New York Rangers || 1–3 || Pittsburgh Penguins || Civic Arena (16,737) || 9–7–2 || 20
|-  style="background:#cfc;"
| 19 || 20 || 7:00 PM || Pittsburgh Penguins || 5–3 || Philadelphia Flyers || Wells Fargo Center (19,349) || 10–7–2 || 22
|-  style="background:#ffc;"
| 20 || 22 || 7:30 PM || Boston Bruins || 4–3 SO || Pittsburgh Penguins || Civic Arena (16,958) || 10–7–3 || 23
|-  style="background:#fcf;"
| 21 || 24 || 2:00 PM || Pittsburgh Penguins || 1–3 || New York Islanders || Nassau Veterans Memorial Coliseum (15,625) || 10–8–3 || 23
|-  style="background:#ffc;"
| 22 || 25 || 7:30 PM || New York Rangers || 2–1 OT || Pittsburgh Penguins || Civic Arena (17,134) || 10–8–4 || 24
|-  style="background:#cfc;"
| 23 || 28 || 7:00 PM || New York Islanders || 2–3 || Pittsburgh Penguins || Civic Arena (17,082) || 11–8–4 || 26
|-

|-  style="background:#fcf;"
| 24 || 1 || 7:30 PM || Pittsburgh Penguins || 2–5 || New Jersey Devils || Izod Center (13,890) || 11–9–4 || 26
|-  style="background:#fcf;"
| 25 || 2 || 7:30 PM || New York Islanders || 5–3 || Pittsburgh Penguins || Civic Arena (17,025) || 11–10–4 || 26
|-  style="background:#fcf;"
| 26 || 5 || 7:30 PM || Florida Panthers || 3–2 || Pittsburgh Penguins || Civic Arena (12,511) || 11–11–4 || 26
|-  style="background:#ffc;"
| 27 || 7 || 7:00 PM || Pittsburgh Penguins || 2–3 SO || New York Rangers || Madison Square Garden (IV) (18,200) || 11–11–5 || 27
|-  style="background:#cfc;"
| 28 || 9 || 7:00 PM || Pittsburgh Penguins || 4–3 OT || Atlanta Thrashers || Philips Arena (18,687) || 12–11–5 || 29
|-  style="background:#cfc;"
| 29 || 11 || 7:00 PM || Pittsburgh Penguins || 5–4 SO || Washington Capitals || Verizon Center (14,793) || 13–11–5 || 31
|-  style="background:#cfc;"
| 30 || 13 || 7:30 PM || Philadelphia Flyers || 4–8 || Pittsburgh Penguins || Civic Arena (14,150) || 14–11–5 || 33
|-  style="background:#cfc;"
| 31 || 15 || 7:30 PM || New York Islanders || 4–7 || Pittsburgh Penguins || Civic Arena (17,028) || 15–11–5 || 35
|-  style="background:#fcf;"
| 32 || 16 || 7:00 PM || Pittsburgh Penguins || 3–6 || Montreal Canadiens || Bell Centre (21,273) || 15–12–5 || 35
|-  style="background:#fcf;"
| 33 || 19 || 7:00 PM || St. Louis Blues || 4–1 || Pittsburgh Penguins || Civic Arena (17,017) || 15–13–5 || 35
|-  style="background:#ffc;"
| 34 || 21 || 7:00 PM || Pittsburgh Penguins || 3–4 SO || Atlanta Thrashers || Philips Arena (17,328) || 15–13–6 || 36
|-  style="background:#fcf;"
| 35 || 26 || 7:30 PM || Pittsburgh Penguins || 0–3 || New Jersey Devils || Izod Center (16,156) || 15–14–6 || 36
|-  style="background:#fcf;"
| 36 || 27 || 7:30 PM || Atlanta Thrashers || 4–2 || Pittsburgh Penguins || Civic Arena (17,132) || 15–15–6 || 36
|-  style="background:#cfc;"
| 37 || 29 || 7:30 PM || Toronto Maple Leafs || 1–4 || Pittsburgh Penguins || Civic Arena (17,132) || 16–15–6 || 38
|-

|-  style="background:#cfc;"
| 38 || 2 || 7:30 PM || Carolina Hurricanes || 0–3 || Pittsburgh Penguins || Civic Arena (16,957) || 17–15–6 || 40
|-  style="background:#cfc;"
| 39 || 5 || 8:00 PM || Pittsburgh Penguins || 4–2 || Buffalo Sabres || First Niagara Center (18,690) || 18–15–6 || 42
|-  style="background:#ffc;"
| 40 || 7 || 7:30 PM || Tampa Bay Lightning || 3–2 SO || Pittsburgh Penguins || Civic Arena (17,132) || 18–15–7 || 43
|-  style="background:#fcf;"
| 41 || 9 || 7:30 PM || Pittsburgh Penguins || 2–3 || Tampa Bay Lightning || Amalie Arena (19,226) || 18–16–7 || 43
|-  style="background:#fcf;"
| 42 || 10 || 7:30 PM || Pittsburgh Penguins || 2–5 || Florida Panthers || BB&T Center (16,098) || 18–17–7 || 43
|-  style="background:#cfc;"
| 43 || 13 || 2:00 PM || Pittsburgh Penguins || 5–3 || Philadelphia Flyers || Wells Fargo Center (19,587) || 19–17–7 || 45
|-  style="background:#cfc;"
| 44 || 16 || 7:00 PM || New York Islanders || 2–5 || Pittsburgh Penguins || Civic Arena (16,958) || 20–17–7 || 47
|-  style="background:#ffc;"
| 45 || 18 || 7:00 PM || Pittsburgh Penguins || 4–5 SO || Boston Bruins || TD Garden (16,468) || 20–17–8 || 48
|-  style="background:#cfc;"
| 46 || 20 || 7:00 PM || Toronto Maple Leafs || 2–8 || Pittsburgh Penguins || Civic Arena (17,132) || 21–17–8 || 50
|-  style="background:#cfc;"
| 47 || 26 || 8:30 PM || Pittsburgh Penguins || 4–3 SO || Dallas Stars || American Airlines Center (18,594) || 22–17–8 || 52
|-  style="background:#cfc;"
| 48 || 27 || 9:00 PM || Pittsburgh Penguins || 7–2 || Phoenix Coyotes || America West Arena (18,495) || 23–17–8 || 54
|-  style="background:#cfc;"
| 49 || 30 || 7:30 PM || Florida Panthers || 0–3 || Pittsburgh Penguins || Civic Arena (15,405) || 24–17–8 || 56
|-

|-  style="background:#cfc;"
| 50 || 1 || 7:30 PM || Montreal Canadiens || 4–5 SO || Pittsburgh Penguins || Civic Arena (17,132) || 25–17–8 || 58
|-  style="background:#cfc;"
| 51 || 3 || 1:00 PM || Washington Capitals || 0–2 || Pittsburgh Penguins || Civic Arena (17,132) || 26–17–8 || 60
|-  style="background:#ffc;"
| 52 || 4 || 2:00 PM || Pittsburgh Penguins || 3–4 OT || Montreal Canadiens || Bell Centre (21,273) || 26–17–9 || 61
|-  style="background:#cfc;"
| 53 || 6 || 7:30 PM || Nashville Predators || 1–4 || Pittsburgh Penguins || Civic Arena (16,333) || 27–17–9 || 63
|-  style="background:#cfc;"
| 54 || 8 || 7:00 PM || Pittsburgh Penguins || 5–4 SO || Philadelphia Flyers || Wells Fargo Center (19,512) || 28–17–9 || 65
|-  style="background:#cfc;"
| 55 || 10 || 7:00 PM || Pittsburgh Penguins || 6–5 OT || Toronto Maple Leafs || Air Canada Centre (19,620) || 29–17–9 || 67
|-  style="background:#cfc;"
| 56 || 14 || 7:30 PM || Chicago Blackhawks || 4–5 SO || Pittsburgh Penguins || Civic Arena (17,051) || 30–17–9 || 69
|-  style="background:#cfc;"
| 57 || 16 || 7:30 PM || Pittsburgh Penguins || 5–4 || New Jersey Devils || Izod Center (15,404) || 31–17–9 || 71
|-  style="background:#cfc;"
| 58 || 18 || 3:30 PM || Washington Capitals || 2–3 || Pittsburgh Penguins || Civic Arena (17,132) || 32–17–9 || 73
|-  style="background:#fcf;"
| 59 || 19 || 1:00 PM || Pittsburgh Penguins || 5–6 || New York Islanders || Nassau Veterans Memorial Coliseum (15,472) || 32–18–9 || 73
|-  style="background:#cfc;"
| 60 || 22 || 7:30 PM || Pittsburgh Penguins || 2–1 OT || Florida Panthers || BB&T Center (17,102) || 33–18–9 || 75
|-  style="background:#fcf;"
| 61 || 25 || 5:00 PM || Pittsburgh Penguins || 1–5 || Tampa Bay Lightning || Amalie Arena (21,119) || 33–19–9 || 75
|-  style="background:#fcf;"
| 62 || 27 || 7:30 PM || New Jersey Devils || 1–0 || Pittsburgh Penguins || Civic Arena (17,006) || 33–20–9 || 75
|-

|-  style="background:#cfc;"
| 63 || 1 || 7:00 PM || Pittsburgh Penguins || 4–3 SO || New York Rangers || Madison Square Garden (IV) (18,200) || 34–20–9 || 77
|-  style="background:#fcf;"
| 64 || 2 || 7:00 PM || Pittsburgh Penguins || 2–3 || Carolina Hurricanes || PNC Arena (18,793) || 34–21–9 || 77
|-  style="background:#cfc;"
| 65 || 4 || 12:30 PM || Philadelphia Flyers || 3–4 SO || Pittsburgh Penguins || Civic Arena (17,132) || 35–21–9 || 79
|-  style="background:#cfc;"
| 66 || 6 || 7:30 PM || Pittsburgh Penguins || 5–4 SO || Ottawa Senators || Canadian Tire Centre (20,074) || 36–21–9 || 81
|-  style="background:#ffc;"
| 67 || 8 || 7:30 PM || New Jersey Devils || 4–3 SO || Pittsburgh Penguins || Civic Arena (17,132) || 36–21–10 || 82
|-  style="background:#cfc;"
| 68 || 10 || 1:00 PM || New York Rangers || 2–3 OT || Pittsburgh Penguins || Civic Arena (17,132) || 37–21–10 || 84
|-  style="background:#cfc;"
| 69 || 13 || 7:30 PM || Buffalo Sabres || 4–5 SO || Pittsburgh Penguins || Civic Arena (17,132) || 38–21–10 || 86
|-  style="background:#cfc;"
| 70 || 14 || 7:30 PM || Pittsburgh Penguins || 3–0 || New Jersey Devils || Izod Center (14,862) || 39–21–10 || 88
|-  style="background:#cfc;"
| 71 || 16 || 7:30 PM || Montreal Canadiens || 3–6 || Pittsburgh Penguins || Civic Arena (17,132) || 40–21–10 || 90
|-  style="background:#cfc;"
| 72 || 18 || 7:30 PM || Ottawa Senators || 3–4 SO || Pittsburgh Penguins || Civic Arena (17,132) || 41–21–10 || 92
|-  style="background:#fcf;"
| 73 || 19 || 7:00 PM || Pittsburgh Penguins || 1–2 || New York Rangers || Madison Square Garden (IV) (18,200) || 41–22–10 || 92
|-  style="background:#fcf;"
| 74 || 22 || 7:30 PM || Pittsburgh Penguins || 1–3 || New York Islanders || Nassau Veterans Memorial Coliseum (14,574) || 41–23–10 || 92
|-  style="background:#cfc;"
| 75 || 24 || 1:00 PM || Atlanta Thrashers || 1–2 || Pittsburgh Penguins || Civic Arena (17,132) || 42–23–10 || 94
|-  style="background:#cfc;"
| 76 || 25 || 12:30 PM || Boston Bruins || 0–5 || Pittsburgh Penguins || Civic Arena (17,132) || 43–23–10 || 96
|-  style="background:#cfc;"
| 77 || 27 || 7:00 PM || Pittsburgh Penguins || 4–3 || Washington Capitals || Verizon Center (18,277) || 44–23–10 || 98
|-  style="background:#cfc;"
| 78 || 29 || 7:00 PM || Pittsburgh Penguins || 4–2 || Boston Bruins || TD Garden (17,095) || 45–23–10 || 100
|-  style="background:#ffc;"
| 79 || 31 || 7:00 PM || Pittsburgh Penguins || 4–5 OT || Toronto Maple Leafs || Air Canada Centre (19,649) || 45–23–11 || 101
|-

|-  style="background:#fcf;"
| 80 || 3 || 7:00 PM || Buffalo Sabres || 4–1 || Pittsburgh Penguins || Civic Arena (17,132) || 45–24–11 || 101
|-  style="background:#cfc;"
| 81 || 5 || 7:30 PM || Pittsburgh Penguins || 3–2 || Ottawa Senators || Canadian Tire Centre (20,064) || 46–24–11 || 103
|-  style="background:#cfc;"
| 82 || 7 || 7:30 PM || New York Rangers || 1–2 || Pittsburgh Penguins || Civic Arena (17,132) || 47–24–11 || 105
|-

|- style="text-align:center;"
| ''Legend:       = Win       = Loss       = OT/SO Loss

Playoffs
The Pittsburgh Penguins ended the 2006–07 regular season as the Eastern Conference's fifth seed. They lost to the Ottawa Senators in five games, in the conference quarter-finals. They would sweep the Senators in the playoffs the following season.
 Green background indicates win.
 Red indicates loss.

|- align="center" bgcolor="#ffbbbb"
| 1 ||April 11||Pittsburgh||3 – 6||Ottawa|| Fleury ||19,611||0–1||
|- align="center" bgcolor="#ccffcc"
| 2 ||April 14||Pittsburgh||4 – 3||Ottawa||Fleury||20,133||1–1||
|- align="center" bgcolor="#ffbbbb"
| 3 ||April 15||Ottawa||4 – 2||Pittsburgh||Fleury||17,132||1–2||
|- align="center" bgcolor="#ffbbbb"
| 4 ||April 17||Ottawa||2 – 1||Pittsburgh||Fleury||17,132||1–3||
|- align="center" bgcolor="#ffbbbb"
| 5 ||April 19||Pittsburgh||0 – 3||Ottawa||Fleury||20,179||1–4||
|-

Player statistics
Skaters

Goaltenders

†Denotes player spent time with another team before joining the Penguins.  Stats reflect time with the Penguins only.
‡Denotes player was traded mid-season.  Stats reflect time with the Team only.

Transactions
The Penguins were involved in the following transactions during the 2006–07 season:

Trades

Free agents acquired

Free agents lost

Claimed via waivers

Lost via waivers

Player signings

Other

Draft picks
Pittsburgh's picks at the 2006 NHL Entry Draft in Vancouver.   The Penguins had the second overall draft pick, making the fourth consecutive draft the team had a pick in the top two: they had the first overall pick in the 2003 NHL Entry Draft (Marc-Andre Fleury), the second overall pick in the 2004 NHL Entry Draft (Evgeni Malkin) and the first overall pick in the 2005 NHL Entry Draft (Sidney Crosby).

Draft notes
 The Pittsburgh Penguins' fourth-round pick went to the Chicago Blackhawks as the result of an August 10, 2005 trade that sent Jocelyn Thibault to the Penguins in exchange for this pick.
 The Pittsburgh Penguins' sixth-round pick went to the Florida Panthers as the result of a January 18, 2006 trade that sent Eric Cairns to the Penguins in exchange for this pick.

Farm teams

Wilkes-Barre/Scranton Penguins
The Wilkes-Barre/Scranton Penguins are Pittsburgh's top affiliate in the AHL for the 2006–07 season.

Wheeling Nailers
The Wheeling Nailers are Pittsburgh's ECHL affiliate for the 2006–07 season.

External links
 Official website of the Pittsburgh Penguins

See also
 2006–07 NHL Season

References
 Game log: Pittsburgh Penguins game log on espn.com
 Team standings: NHL standings on espn.com

Pitts
Pitts
Pittsburgh Penguins seasons
Pitts
Pitts